Keeley Rebecca Hazell (born 18 September 1986) is an English model and actress. Hazell was a Page 3 girl and has worked with magazines such as FHM, Loaded, Nuts and Zoo Weekly. She has also made numerous television appearances and has focused on her acting career, appearing in films such as Horrible Bosses 2 (2014) and the streaming television series Ted Lasso (2020).

Early life
Hazell was born on 18 September 1986 in Lewisham, London, England, and grew up in Grove Park. She attended the Ravensbourne School in Bromley. Her mother Amber was a dinner lady and her father Roy was a window fitter; they separated when Hazell was 13 years old.

Career

Modelling

At 16 years of age, Hazell left school to work as a hairdresser. Her colleagues persuaded her to try her luck at modelling. At 17 years of age, she competed in The Daily Star's "Search for a Beach Babe" contest and won. Still not old enough to pose on Page 3, she went to study fashion at Lewisham College. Later, a friend told her about The Sun's Page 3 Idol competition. Despite some initial uncertainty about entering the contest, she submitted some photos. She was eventually chosen the winner in December 2004. She won £10,000 worth of "sexy clothes" and "a one-year membership of the Rex cinema and bar". Another part of Hazell's Page 3 Idol win was a one-year exclusive glamour modelling contract with The Sun.

Hazell has been regularly featured in Nuts and Zoo Weekly. In June 2005, she appeared on the front cover of Maxim magazine and she also appeared on the front cover of FHM in September that year. In January 2006, she appeared on the front cover of Loaded magazine. She was on the cover of The Sun's 2006 and 2007 Page 3 calendars in addition to releasing her own wall calendars, her own 2007 edition selling 30,000 copies in its first few days of release.

In 2008, Hazell and agent Ginny Mettrick co-founded a modelling agency called Muse Management. In 2009, according to the August edition of Loaded, Peta Todd stated that Hazell had given modelling up to pursue a career in acting and that she was in America receiving acting lessons. Her last appearance on Page 3 of The Sun was on 30 September 2009. In January 2013, Hazell made a return to modelling by appearing in FHM.

Other media appearances
Hazell was chosen to promote Sony Computer Entertainment Europe's Formula One 06 video game released in July 2006 for PlayStation 2 and PlayStation Portable; and Formula One Championship Edition for PlayStation 3 the following year. She then became the face of MotorStorm: Pacific Rift (2008) for PlayStation 3.

Hazell had a small role in the 2006 film Cashback after it had been reworked from a short into a full-length movie. The following year, she was in talks with producers to be in a movie based on the television series Baywatch.

In 2007, Hazell and IT expert Gary Schwartz co-presented Byte Me TV, an online programme that tried to explain technology in an easy-to-understand way. The following year she appeared in the BBC Three documentary Page Three Teens; and released a pop music single called "Voyeur".

In 2010, Hazell had her first lead role, in the short film Venus and the Sun, a comedic retelling of Ovid's myth, Venus and Adonis. She followed this up with a small role in the film Like Crazy, which won both the Grand and a Special Jury Prize at the 2011 Sundance Film Festival.

In 2012, Hazell played a supporting role in the British gangster movie St George's Day. She then starred in the 2013 comedy film Awful Nice and the 2015 horror film Whispers. Also in 2015, she landed a television role, in E!'s first scripted drama, The Royals, as Violet. She then appeared in the 2016 short film Queen of Hearts and two years later appeared in the 2018 TV Movie Vows of Deceit. In 2020 she appeared in the streaming television series Ted Lasso as Bex, the girlfriend of the former owner of AFC Richmond, Rupert Mannion.

Writing 
Hazell's memoir Everyone’s Seen My Tits will be published by Grand Central Publishing. She is a writer on the third season of Ted Lasso.

Filmography

Film

Television

Environmental and charitable work
Hazell was hailed by Conservative leader David Cameron in December 2006 as an "environmental hero" for her campaigns in The Sun, giving environmental tips such as turning lights off during the day. She was named alongside the likes of David Attenborough, Charles III, and Arnold Schwarzenegger in the Tories' list.

Hazell backed a major breast cancer awareness campaign for Breakthrough Breast Cancer. The campaign, called 'TALK TLC', aimed to promote Breakthrough's breast health message about the need to be aware of the signs and symptoms of breast cancer. Hazell has also signed up to take part in the Breakthrough Generations Study consisting of 100,000 women and spanning 40 years; the study aims to be the largest and most comprehensive of its kind.

Hazell has also appeared naked in advertising posters for People for the Ethical Treatment of Animals (PETA), and she has been quoted as saying: "Once you learn how the fur trade treats animals, it's impossible to think of wearing fur as sexy or glamorous."

Polls and honours

 Winner of The Suns "Page 3 Idol 2004"
 #17 in Loadeds "100 Peachiest Celebrity Chests 2005"
 #1 in Zoos "Britain's 10 Sexiest Models"
 #1 in Zoos "100 Sexiest Bodies 2005"
 #1 in The Suns "Favourite Page 3 Girls of All Time"
 Voted "Best Page 3 Girl" at the FHM 2006 Bloke Awards
 #2 in [[FHM's 100 Sexiest Women (UK)|FHMs "100 Sexiest Women In The World 2006"]]
 Winner of The Sun Online's "Reality Babe Cup"
 #1 in Zoo'''s "100 Sexiest Bodies 2006"
 "Best Celeb Body 2006" (More readers' survey)
 #19 in AskMen.com "Top 99 Most Desirable Women 2007 Edition"
 #9 in [[FHM's 100 Sexiest Women (UK)#Most Eligible Bachelorettes|FHMs "50 Most Eligible Bachelorettes 2007"]]
 #2 in FHMs "100 Sexiest Women in the World 2007"
 #3 in FHMs "100 Sexiest Women in the World 2008"
 #2 in IGN Babe Election 2008
 #4 in AskMen.com "Top 99 Most Desirable Women 2009 Edition"
 #5 in FHMs "100 Sexiest Women in the World 2009"
 #3 seed in KJR-AM's "Bigger Dance Bracket", eliminated in Championship by Megan Fox
 #5 in FHMs "100 Sexiest Women in the World 2010"
 #8 in FHMs "100 Sexiest Women in the World 2012"
 #21 in FHM's "100 Sexiest Women in the World 2013"

See also

 Lad culture
 Lad mags

References

Further reading
 "Keeley Hazell Does FHM UK"
 "Alternative Icons of the Year" (January 2007), Arena Coan, Lee (September 2005) "Top girl", FHM, pp. 74–80
 "Keeley Got Me Going" (October 2005), 3zine''

External links
 
 

1986 births
21st-century English actresses
Actresses from London
English female models
English film actresses
Glamour models
Living people
Page 3 girls
People from Lewisham
Actresses from Kent
English screenwriters
Models from London
Writers from London
People educated at Ravensbourne School, Bromley